Igael Tumarkin (Hebrew: יגאל תומרקין; 23 October 1933 – 12 August 2021) was an Israeli painter and sculptor.

Biography
Peter Martin Gregor Heinrich Hellberg (later Igael Tumarkin) was born in 1933 in Dresden, Saxony, Germany. His father, Martin Hellberg, was a German theater actor and director, and a son of a pastor. His Jewish mother, Berta Gurevitch, and his stepfather, Herzl Tumarkin, immigrated to then British Mandate of Palestine (now Israel) when he was two.

Tumarkin served in the Israeli Navy. After completing his military service, he studied sculpture in Ein Hod, a village of artists near Mount Carmel, under Rudi Lehmann. His youngest son is the actor Yon Tumarkin. Tumarkin died at the age of 87 on 12 August 2021.

Art career

Among Tumarkin's best known works are the Holocaust and Revival memorial in Rabin Square, Tel Aviv and his sculptures commemorate fallen soldiers in the Negev.

Tumarkin was also an art theoretician and stage designer. In the 1950s, Tumarkin worked in East Berlin, Amsterdam, and Paris. Upon his return to Israel in 1961, he became a driving force behind the break from the charismatic monopoly of lyric abstraction there. Tumarkin created assemblages of found objects, generally with violent expressionist undertones and decidedly unlyrical color. His determination to "be different" influenced his younger Israeli colleagues. The furor generated around Tumarkin's works, such as the old pair of trousers stuck to one of his pictures, intensified the mystique surrounding him. One of his controversial works is a pig wearing phylacteries (or tfilin, small boxes containing scriptures).

Education 
 1954 – Studied with Rudi Lehmann, Ein-Hod
 1955 Studied with Bertolt Brecht, Berliner Ensemble, Berlin
 1955-57 Assistant to the designer Karl von Appen

Awards and recognition
 1963 First Prize for Battle of Hulaykat Monument
 1968 The Sandberg Prize for Israeli Art, Israel Museum, Jerusalem, Israel
 1968 First Prize for Memorial to Sailors, Haifa
 1971 First Prize for Memorial for "Holocaust and Revival", Tel Aviv
 1978 First Prize in the Biennale for Drawing, Reike
 1984 Award from the President of the Italian Republic
 1985 Dizengoff Prize for Sculpture
 1990 Guest of the Japan Foundation
 1992 August Rodin Prize, The International Sculpture Competition of the Open Museum, Hakone, Japan, for his sculpture of the sign at the entrance to Auschwitz concentration camp Arbeit Macht Frei.
 1997 Award of Excellence, the President of the Federal Republic of Germany
 1998 Sussman Prize, Vienna
 2004 Israel Prize for sculpture

Outdoor and public art
Tumarkin created over 80 outdoor sculptures in Israel and around the world.

 1962-68 "Panorama", concrete and steel, Arad, Israel
 1962-69 "Age of Science", concrete and steel, Dimona
 1963 "Vibrations A & B", concrete, Kiryat Yam and "Window to the Sea", concrete, Atlit
 1964-65 "Monument for the Holocaust", concrete and steel, Nazareth
 1966 "Peace Memorial", Hebron Road, Jerusalem
1967 “He Walked in the Fields”
1968 Arad Observatory sculpture
 1968 "Big Chief", tank assemblage painted, Kiryat Shmona
 1969-71 "War and Peace", steel and stone, Ramat Gan
 1970 "Keystone Gate", painted steel, Jerusalem
 1970 "Homage to Dürer, painted steel, Haifa
 1971 "Homage to Jerusalem", Givat Shapira
 1971 Sculpture Garden, 61 Weizmann Street, Holon
 1971-75 "Monument to the Holocaust and Revival", corten and glass, Tel Aviv
 1972 "Happenings and Homage to Kepler", concrete and painted steel, Tel Aviv University, Tel Aviv; "Sundial Garden", concrete, Ashkelon; and "Monument to the Fallen", concrete painted white and steel, Jordan Valley
 1972-73 "Airport Monument", painted steel, Lod
 1973 "Challenge to the Sun", Ramot Alon, Jerusalem
 1986 "Chichen Itzma", Kiryat Menahem, Jerusalem
 1986 Pisgat Zeev, Jerusalem
 1989 Homage to Robert Capa, Pozoblanco, Spain
 1989 La Liberte, Bordeaux, France
 1991 Bertolt Brecht, Berlin Museum Garden
 1992 "Jerusalem – Three Faiths", Mount Scopus, Jerusalem
 1993 Semaphore, Weizmann Institute of Science, Rehovot
 1993 My Seven Pillars of Wisdom, Hakone Open Air Museum, Japan
 1994–96 The Sculpture Garden of Belvoir (Kochav HaYarden)
 1997 Memorial for Yitzhak Rabin, Ramat Gan Museum
 2000 Abu Nabut Garden, Jaffa

See also
List of Israel Prize recipients
Visual arts in Israel

References

External links 

 
 
 
 Amnon Teitelbaum, Land, Wind and Rust - a Portrait of an Artist (Documentay) (2000)

1933 births
2021 deaths
Israeli Jews
Israel Prize in sculpture recipients
Israeli sculptors
Sandberg Prize recipients
People from Dresden
Jewish emigrants from Nazi Germany to Mandatory Palestine
Israeli people of German descent